Bancoumana or Bankoumana is a small town and rural commune in the Cercle of Kati in the Koulikoro Region of south-western Mali. The commune includes the town and 13 villages. At the time of the 2009 census it had a population of 21,714. The town of Bancoumana lies on the left bank of the River Niger 60 km southwest of Bamako, the Malian capital.

References

External links
.

Communes of Koulikoro Region